Peter Kolesár (born 9 July 1998) is a Slovak footballer who plays as an attacking midfielder or a winger for FK Slavoj Trebišov.

Club career

Zemplín Michalovce
Kolesár made his professional Fortuna Liga debut for Zemplín Michalovce on 21 February 2017 against Spartak Trnava.

Despite being a crucial player of the team during the 2019–20 season, Kolesár did not continue after the Fortuna Liga had resumed following the coronavirus pandemic, seeking new challenges and not agreeing with Zemplín Michalovce on a contract extension.

References

External links
 MFK Zemplín Michalovce profile 
 
 Futbalnet profile 

1998 births
Living people
Sportspeople from Trebišov
Slovak footballers
Slovakia youth international footballers
Slovakia under-21 international footballers
Association football midfielders
MFK Zemplín Michalovce players
FC Spartak Trnava players
FC ViOn Zlaté Moravce players
FK Slavoj Trebišov players
Slovak Super Liga players